Gourdan-Polignan is a commune in the Haute-Garonne department in southwestern France. Montréjeau-Gourdan-Polignan station has rail connections to Toulouse, Pau, Bayonne and Tarbes.

Population

See also
Communes of the Haute-Garonne department

References

Communes of Haute-Garonne
Haute-Garonne communes articles needing translation from French Wikipedia